Gennadiy Lagomina is a Ukrainian retired footballer.

Career
Gennadiy Lagomina started his career in 1992 with Zirka Kropyvnytskyi. In 1993 he played 20 matches for one season with Kirovets Makiivka. In 1994 he moved to Silur Khartsyzsk where he played 10 matches and then he moved to Desna Chernihiv in Chernihiv, here he stayed until 1996 playing 31 matches and scored 1 goal. In 1996 he moved to Industriya Borovsk in Russia in the Russian Second Division. In 1997 he moved to Spartak Ryazan in the Russian First Division playing 5 matches and in 1998 he played 6 matches scoring 5 goals with Neftyanik Bugulma in the Russian Amateur Football League. In 1999 he played 1 match for Spartak Lukhovitsy.

References

External links 
 Gennadiy Lagomina at footballfacts.ru

1973 births
Living people
FC Desna Chernihiv players
FC Shakhtar Makiivka players
FC Khartsyzk players
FC Spartak Ryazan players
FC Lukhovitsy players
Ukrainian footballers
Ukrainian Premier League players
Ukrainian First League players
Ukrainian Second League players
Ukrainian expatriate footballers
Ukrainian expatriate sportspeople in Russia
Expatriate footballers in Russia
Association football forwards